Šumadija-Raška Zone League (Serbian: Шумадијско-рашка зонска лига / Šumadijsko-Raška zonska liga) is one of the Serbian Zone League divisions, the fourth tier of the Serbian football league system. It is run by the Football Association of West Serbia.

The league was founded in 2018, together with the Kolubara-Mačva Zone League, Podunavlje-Šumadija Zone League and West Morava Zone League.

Clubs that participate in this competition come from Raška District, the city of Kragujevac, municipality of Knić and Serbian clubs from District of Mitrovica.

Winners of all championships 

 1  Season cancelled after 16 rounds due to COVID-19 pandemic

Participants 2022-23

All-time table 
Standings after round 13 of the season 2022–23.

Clubs that participate in season 2022–23 are colored in blue.

Bolded parameters are records in those categories.

Some clubs withdrew from the competition in the middle of the season. This table includes the results of all their matches played in those seasons, although these results were annulled on the official competition tables.

Seasons – number of seasons played in that competition, GP – number of matches played, W – number of victories, D – number of matches ended in a draw, L – number of defeats, GS – number of goals scored, GC – number of goals conceded, GD – goal difference PPG – points per game, BR – the best placement in this competition

All-time participants 
W – club withdrew from the competition in the middle of the season

References 

Serbian Zone League